Everett Mills may refer to:

Everett Mills An American Major League Baseball Player
The Everett Mills a former textile mill in Lawrence, Massachusetts.